Myrospermum frutescens, the cercipo, is a species of flowering plant in the legume family, Fabaceae. It belongs to the subfamily Faboideae. It is the only member of the genus Myrospermum.

References

Amburaneae
Monotypic Fabaceae genera